Cumyl-BC-HpMeGaClone-221 (Cumyl-BC[2.2.1]HpMeGaClone, SGT-271) is a gamma-carboline derivative which is a synthetic cannabinoid that has been sold as a designer drug. It was first identified in Germany in September 2020.

See also 
 CUMYL-CB-MEGACLONE
 CUMYL-CH-MEGACLONE
 CUMYL-PEGACLONE
 CUMYL-NBMINACA

References 

Cannabinoids
Designer drugs
Gamma-Carbolines
Nitrogen heterocycles
Heterocyclic compounds with 2 rings